Metropolitan Chamber of Commerce and Industry, Dhaka (MCCI), established in 1904, is the oldest trade organization of Bangladesh.

History, mission and vision 
MCCI represented in many Advisory Councils as well as Committees formed by various ministries of Government of Bangladesh. Also maintains effective working relations with development partners like World Bank Group, Asian Development Bank (ADB), Japan External Trade Organization (JETRO), Japan International Cooperation Agency (JICA), Asia Foundation. MCCI has a long history of joint collaboration and corporate understanding. The chamber published regular publication based on Bangladesh economy and business sector. Also published research report.

Board
 Md Saiful Islam, President
 Mr. Kamran T Rahman, Senior Vice President
 Habibullah N. Karim, Vice President

References

External links
 Office of Metropolitan Chamber of Commerce and Industry
 Bangladesh International Chamber of Commerce

Chambers of commerce in Bangladesh
Business organisations based in Bangladesh
Economy of Dhaka
Chambers of commerce